Life in the Concrete Jungle is the second and final  album from New Orleans rap group Chopper City Boyz, led by rapper B.G. It was first scheduled for an August 26 release but was pushed back and released on September 16, 2008. The first single off the album is "Bubblegum", which was produced by Joe the CEO.

Track listing

Chart positions

References

External links
 Asylum Records Life in the Concrete Jungle News Page

2008 albums
Asylum Records albums
Chopper City Boyz albums